Live at Firehouse 12 is an album by American jazz saxophonist Rob Brown recorded in 2007 and released on the Polish Not Two label. It features a trio with Brown on alto sax, Daniel Levin on cello and Japanese Satoshi Takeishi on percussion, the same band that released Sounds. The music was composed by Brown with help from a grant from Chamber Music America. The final track, "Stray(horn)", is a ballad dedicated to Billy Strayhorn.

Reception
The All About Jazz review by Jeff Stockton states "Brown's band mates are masters of small gestures, which make their virtuosic flourishes all the more dramatic... Brown's tone is forceful and controlled even when his energy sends him on the attack."

Track listing
All compositions by Rob Brown
 "Quick Be Nimble" – 8:30
 "Walkabout" – 14:39
 "On a Lark" – 9:34
 "Stray(horn)" – 11:56

Personnel
Rob Brown – alto sax
Daniel Levin - cello
Satoshi Takeishi – percussion

References

2007 live albums
Rob Brown (saxophonist) live albums